Zheng Siwei (born 26 February 1997) is a Chinese badminton player specializing in doubles. Zheng is three times World Champion and Asian games gold medalists in the mixed doubles with his current partner Huang Yaqiong. He also helped the national team clinch the 2018 Thomas and 2019 Sudirman Cup.

Zheng entered the national team in 2013, made an excellence performance in the junior events, by collecting four gold medals, a silver and a bronze at the World Junior Championships, also six golds and a silver at the Asian Junior Championships from 2013–2015. Although Zheng stilled as a junior, he has shown a good performance in the senior event, by winning doubles titles in New Zealand and Brasil Open. For his achievements in 2015, the BWF awarded him the Eddy Choong Most Promising Player of the Year.

Zheng provoked the girders, achieved an outbreak in 2016 by setting off the world number 1 in mixed doubles partnering with Chen Qingchen in December 2016. He and Chen reached thirteen Superseries finals, won the year-end tournament Dubai World Superseries Finals in 2016 and 2017, and the silver medal at the 2017 World Championships. He made a new partnership with Huang Yaqiong in November 2017, opened their career by winning the China, Hong Kong and Macau Open in consecutive weeks. He again occupied the mixed doubles world number 1 on 9 August 2018, with the achievements of seven 2018 World Tour titles, the gold medals at the World Championships and Asian Games.

Career 

Zheng and his partner Huang Yaqiong competed at the 2020 Summer Olympics as the top seeds. They won a silver medal after being defeated by their compatriots Wang Yilyu and Huang Dongping in the final in a close rubber game.

Achievements

Olympic Games 
Mixed doubles

BWF World Championships 
Mixed doubles

Asian Games 
Mixed doubles

Asian Championships 
Mixed doubles

BWF World Junior Championships 
Boys' doubles

Mixed doubles

Asian Junior Championships 
Boys' doubles

Mixed doubles

BWF World Tour (25 titles, 6 runners-up) 
The BWF World Tour, which was announced on 19 March 2017 and implemented in 2018, is a series of elite badminton tournaments sanctioned by the Badminton World Federation (BWF). The BWF World Tour is divided into levels of World Tour Finals, Super 1000, Super 750, Super 500, Super 300, and the BWF Tour Super 100.

Mixed doubles

BWF Superseries (8 titles, 8 runners-up) 
The BWF Superseries, which was launched on 14 December 2006 and implemented in 2007, is a series of elite badminton tournaments, sanctioned by the Badminton World Federation (BWF). BWF Superseries levels are Superseries and Superseries Premier. A season of Superseries consists of twelve tournaments around the world that have been introduced since 2011. Successful players are invited to the Superseries Finals, which are held at the end of each year.

Men's doubles

Mixed doubles

  BWF Superseries Finals tournament
  BWF Superseries Premier tournament
  BWF Superseries tournament

BWF Grand Prix (10 titles, 3 runners-up) 
The BWF Grand Prix had two levels, the Grand Prix and Grand Prix Gold. It was a series of badminton tournaments sanctioned by the Badminton World Federation (BWF) and played between 2007 and 2017.

Men's doubles

Mixed doubles

  BWF Grand Prix Gold tournament
  BWF Grand Prix tournament

BWF International Challenge/Series (1 title) 
Mixed doubles

  BWF International Challenge tournament
  BWF International Series tournament

Performance timeline

National team 
 Junior level

 Senior level

Individual competitions

Junior level
 Boys' singles

 Boys' doubles

 Mixed doubles

Senior level

Men's doubles

Mixed doubles

References

External links

 
 

1997 births
Living people
Sportspeople from Wenzhou
Badminton players from Zhejiang
Chinese male badminton players
Badminton players at the 2020 Summer Olympics
Olympic badminton players of China
Olympic silver medalists for China
Olympic medalists in badminton
Medalists at the 2020 Summer Olympics
Badminton players at the 2018 Asian Games
Asian Games gold medalists for China
Asian Games medalists in badminton
Medalists at the 2018 Asian Games
World No. 1 badminton players